Mroczno  is a village in the administrative district of Gmina Grodziczno, within Nowe Miasto County, Warmian-Masurian Voivodeship, in northern Poland.

The village has a population of 1,169.

References

Mroczno